Archery at the 2011 Pan American Games was held over a six-day period from October 17 to October 22. The events took place at the newly built Pan American Archery Stadium in Guadalajara, Mexico. Just like in the Olympics, the archery competition will be held using the recurve bow.

Medal summary

Medal table

Events

Schedule
All times are Central Daylight Time (UTC-5).

Qualification

The athlete quota for archery is 64 athletes, 32 men and 32 women. There is a maximum of six athletes per National Olympic Committee, three per gender. NOC's with three athletes of the same gender automatically qualify for the team competition. There will be 2 qualification tournaments for each gender to qualify athletes.

See also
Archery at the 2012 Summer Olympics

References